Barclay was an American brand of cigarettes manufactured by R. J. Reynolds Tobacco Company in the U.S. and by British American Tobacco outside of the U.S.

First introduced in 1966, the brand was discontinued in 2006.

Advertising
Brown & Williamson made various magazine and print adverts to promote the Barclay brand since its launch in 1980. The ads showed a man with a classy tuxedo suit with a Barclay cigarette in his mouth with the slogan "The pleasure is back" underneath. The slogan "99% tar free" was also present, but eventually had to be removed, as the FTC determined that this is not accurate when a human smokes the cigarette, as opposed to the FTC's test equipment.

Sponsorship

Formula 1

Barclay sponsored various Formula 1 teams in the 1980s and 1990s.

The brand was displayed on the front wing, sides, rear wing and on the drivers' helmets. In countries where tobacco sponsorship was forbidden, the logos were removed from the car.

The brand was displayed on the sides and on the drivers' helmets. In countries where tobacco sponsorship was forbidden, the logos were replaced with the Barclay emblem, as well as a red-white line.

The brand was displayed on the sides, the side of the rear wing and on the drivers' helmets. In countries where tobacco sponsorship was forbidden, the logos were replaced with the Barclay emblem, as well as a red-white line.

Formula 3000
Barclay sponsored the "Team Barclay EJR" team in the 1991 Formula 3000 Series championship.

Markets
Barclay cigarettes were sold in the following countries: United States, Martinique, Chile, Norway, Sweden, Finland, Luxembourg, Belgium, The Netherlands, Germany, France, Switzerland, Italy, Estonia, Latvia, Lithuania and Russia.

See also
 Tobacco smoking

References

British American Tobacco brands
R. J. Reynolds Tobacco Company brands
Products introduced in 1980
Products and services discontinued in 2006
1980 establishments in the United States
2006 disestablishments in the United States